Mirae Asset Park Hyeon Joo Foundation is a private foundation based in Mirae Asset Center 1 Building, Seoul, South Korea. The foundation was founded by Hyeon Joo Park, a founder and GISO of Mirae Asset Financial Group, in 2000 with his own wealth of KRW 7.5 billion which was three years after the foundation of Mirae Asset Financial Group when the company’s equity capital stood at KRW 30 billion. One of Park Hyeon Joo's primary social responsibility is giving more and better educational opportunities to talented students as one of a way to return the earned profits from the business activities to the society. Therefore, the primary purpose of the foundation is aiding scholarship for exchange program to college students located in South Korea. Furthermore, Park Hyeon Joo has been donating all his dividends paid out from his shares held in affiliates to the foundation every year to fulfill the practice of warm capitalism.

History 
 In 2000, Mirae Asset Park Hyeon Joo Foundation (the 1st president: Byeon Hyeong Yoon) was established, Domestic Scholarship Program was initiated.
 In 2003, started to donate books to study rooms
 In 2006, Global Investment Expert Scholarship Program was initiated
 In 2007, Global Exchange Scholarship Program was initiated, and Global Cultural Experience Program was commenced
 In 2008, commenced a book donation program for regional children centers called ‘Hope of Book Café’
 In 2011, renovated the study rooms and commenced ‘Youth for Hope’ project
 In 2012, the 2nd president, Lee Gi Su, was appointed. Mirae Asset matching grant plan was launched.
 In 2013, commenced book donation called ‘Full of Hope’
 In 2014, appointed as a ‘sound non-profit organization, and commenced ‘Financial Career Training Program for Youth’
 In 2015, cultural experience activity funds are delivered to regional children’s centers and group homes
 In 2016, commenced workshop for readings and project called ‘Youth Vision Project’
 In 2018, the 3rd president, Chung Un Chan, has been appointed. Number of students who were beneficiary on Mirae Asset Scholarship Program reaches 8,000
 In 2019, Number of students who were beneficiary on Mirae Asset Scholarship Program reaches 9,000
 In 2021, Number of students who were beneficiary on Mirae Asset Scholarship Program reaches 10,000

Major Programs 

Under the vision that ‘Mirae Asset will be the hope of the youth’, Mirae Asset operates programs primarily aiming on a scholarships, social welfare and culture of sharing. Through scholarships and social welfare programs, the number of participants in nurturing talents has reached to 390,000 (as of Dec 2022).

Global Exchange Scholarship Program 
As being the largest overseas exchange student scholarship program in Korea, the foundation supports 500 students annually with their academic expenses. Undergraduate students who have met the criteria of the foundation’s assessments in grades and their financial status of their 4-year university courses are selected as the exchange students, which have accumulated to 6,479 students.

Global Cultural Experience Program 

The foundation has been supporting children and youth on 3 nights and 4 days camping excursions to China in order to broaden their knowledge and perspective to ultimately set up their lifetime goal. This program supports students to experience various cultures with different nationalities through traveling. The global cultural exchange program includes experiencing daily local life, understanding their history and visiting information technology sites. The program is provided biannually to 100 participants at a time reaching 1,968.

Book Donation “My Own Dream Library”
Foundation encourages children to discover the fun and value of reading by helping them curate their own personal libraries.
So,Foundation provides children with My Own Dream Library kits(bookshelves, a small individual sign,individual recommended books considering of each student’s living conditions, interests and the level of reading, etc.) setting them on a journey of discovery through books.The program provided a total of 1,801 people, about 900 at a time.(since 2021)

Youth Vision Project 

The foundation offers ‘Make Experience Program’ to facilitate young teenagers to enhance their flexible and creative thinking skill in this disruptive era. The curriculum supports each participant to engage in the entire process of problem solving from planning, designing, producing to implementing by utilizing coding, 3D printing, and robotic technologies based on ‘Design Thinking’ process which is a creative problem solving methodology.

Culture of Sharing 

The foundation supports various programs through interactive collaboration with Mirae Asset subsidiaries, and its executives and employees. They may take part in donations through diverse ways. In turn, each subsidiary contributes the matching amount of the donations made by its executives and employees to the foundation to support the program. 

 Mirae Asset 1% Hope Sharing Campaign: Executives of Mirae Asset donate 1% of their monthly salary
 Periodical Donation 'I Love You' Campaign: Employees of Mirae Asset participate in one-time donations to commemorate special occasions in addition to periodic donations
 Matching Grant Campaign of subsidiaries: 1:1 Matching Grant Campaign where the company donates the matching amount of donations made by executive or employees of a subsidiaries
 Entire Dividend Donation by Park Hyeon Joo (Founder and Mirae Asset GISO): Park Hyeon Joo established the foundation with his own wealth worth of KRW 7.5 billion in 2000. He has been donating the entire dividends to the foundation for the young talents of Korea since 2010.

Awards 

 In 2009, Mayor of Seoul Award, Children and Welfare Sector.
 In 2016, the 11th Kyunghyang Finance Education, Chief of Financial Services Commission Award.
 In 2018, Minister of Health and Welfare Award, Regional Children’s Center Support Sector.
 In 2019, the 10th KCCI (Korea Chamber of Commerce and Industry) Forbes CSR Award, Children and Youth Welfare Sector.

Reception

The foundation received a perfect score in transparency and financial stability evaluation for non-profit foundations according to Guide Star Korea. (Based on its performance at the end of 2016 and 2017)

References

External links 
 Mirae Asset Park Hyeon Joo Foundation homepage
 Mirae Asset Park Hyeon Joo Foundation annual reports
 Web community Mirae Asset Exchange Student Scholarship

Foundations based in South Korea
Organizations established in 2000
Organizations based in Seoul